Bleu d'Élizabeth is a brand used to commercially identify a farmhouse cheese made from thermized cow's milk produced organically in Canada, in the province of Quebec in Sainte-Élizabeth-de-Warwick. This brand belongs to the owners of the Louis d'Or farm.

Presentation 
Bleu d'Élizabeth is a semi-firm, blue-veined cow 's milk cheese. Its rind is dotted with ocher spots and the cheese contains bluish or greenish furrows due to the presence of penicillium roqueforti. This cheese has a smell of cream, butter, cellar and contains 28% fat. Each cheese weighs 1200 grams.

Raw milk processing 
The raw milk produced by the Louis d'Or farm is transformed using industrial means into Bleu d'Élizabeth at the Fromagerie du Presbytère, an agricultural dairy processing tool installed in a former presbytery. The process implemented is inspired by well-known French cheeses such as Fourme d'Ambert, Bleu d'Auvergne, etc. However, raw milk undergoes thermization. Refining is 60 days.

References

Bibliography 
 Bizier, Richard & Nadeau, Roch, Quebec Cheese Directory , Trécarré, Montreal, 2008, p. 65.
 Tendland, Amélie, Cheeses: 100 Quebec products to discover, Éditions Caractère, Montreal, 2012, p. 220
Cow's-milk cheeses
Cuisine of Quebec
Canadian cheeses
Blue cheeses